Larijan was the name of a district that encompassed the entire area covered by the Lar River in Mazandaran, a region on the Caspian coast of northern Iran. The mythical Iranian king Fereydun was said to have been born in a village in Larijan.

References

Sources 
 
 
 

Mazandaran Province
Geographic history of Iran